Events from the year 1412 in Ireland.

Incumbent
Lord: Henry IV

Events
 Drogheda-in-Meath (for which a charter was granted in 1194) and Drogheda-in-Oriel (or 'Uriel') as County Louth was then known, were united and Drogheda became a 'County Corporate', styled as 'the County of the Town of Drogheda'.

Births

Deaths

 
1410s in Ireland
Ireland
Years of the 15th century in Ireland